Joshua Grelle (born November 2, 1985) is an American voice actor and ADR script writer in English language dubs of Japanese anime, working mostly with Funimation, ADV Films and Seraphim Digital. Grelle is known for voicing numerous main characters in the harem genre. Major roles include: Armin Arlert in Attack on Titan, Itsuki Takeuchi in Initial D, Nobuchika Ginoza in Psycho-Pass, Glenn Radars in Akashic Records of Bastard Magic Instructor, Kenichi Shirahama in Kenichi: The Mightiest Disciple, Fumikage Tokoyami in My Hero Academia, Mao Sadou / Demon King Satan in The Devil Is a Part-Timer! and Yuri Katsuki in Yuri on Ice!!!. Grelle has voiced lead characters, Zen Wisteria in Snow White with the Red Hair, Kyohei Takano in The Wallflower, Komatsu in Toriko, Akihisa Yoshii in Baka and Test, Koichi Hayase in Linebarrels of Iron, Kazuya Aoi in Freezing, Tasuku Yamane in Trickster, Yuki "Yukiteru" Amano in The Future Diary, Atsushi Hatake in Big Windup!, Shido Itsuka in the Date A Live series, Futaro Uesugi in The Quintessential Quintuplets, Masamune in Masamune-kun no Revenge, Yamato Naoe in Majikoi!, Touya in In Another World With My Smartphone, Ichika Orimura in Infinite Stratos and Issei Hyodo in High School DxD: BorN and the 4th season, titled "Hero". On video games, Grelle voiced Ludger Kresnik in Tales of Xillia 2, Phog from Xenoblade Chronicles X and Xbalanque from Smite.

Personal life 
Grelle has one younger brother. In 2017, Grelle married Joanna Grelle (née Beatty).

In March 2023, Grelle came out as a transgender female, using they/she pronouns.

Filmography

Anime

Animation

Film

Video games

References

External links

Josh Grelle at CrystalAcids Anime Voice Actor Database

Living people
21st-century American actors
Writers from Dallas
Screenwriters from Texas
Funimation
American non-binary actors
LGBT people from Texas
Non-binary writers
1985 births